The International Trade Centre (ITC) is a multilateral agency which has a joint mandate with the 
World Trade Organization (WTO) and the United Nations (UN) through the United Nations Conference on Trade and Development (UNCTAD).

The headquarters of the ITC are in Geneva, and the agency employs around 300 employees from over 80 different nationalities.

History
ITC is the successor to the International Trade Information Centre, which the General Agreement on Tariffs and Trade (GATT) established in 1964 to assist the exports of developing countries. An agreement was reached between the GATT and the newly established UNCTAD to create a joint subsidiary in 1967. The International Trade Centre (ITC) was established on 1 January 1968. The ITC has a joint mandate with the World Trade Organization (WTO) and the United Nations (UN) through the United Nations Conference on Trade and Development (UNCTAD). The ITC is the focal point for trade-related technical assistance.

Programmes
The ITC is involved in projects providing trade-related technical assistance in countries all over the world.

Advancing Afghan Trade
In 2016, the European Union (EU) and the ITC launched the "Afghanistan: Trade for Economic Growth & Regional Cooperation" initiative in response to Afghanistan’s accession to the World Trade Organization (WTO). The initiative aims to use trade as a means of promoting economic growth, creating jobs, reducing poverty, and improving regional cooperation in Afghanistan. 
The initiative consists of a three-year plan (2016 - 2019), and the Ministry of Commerce and Industry is involved in its implementation.
It is funded by the EU and has a budget of 4.5 million euros.

Ethical Fashion Initiative
The Ethical Fashion Initiative focuses on the specific skills of artisans and brings them to known fashion brands such as Stella McCartney, Marni, Vivienne Westwood, Edun, and Camper. This synergy helps artisans from developing countries, such as Kenya, Burkina Faso, and Haiti, to gain a living while exposing the designers to unique skills and handmade goods. The initiative also involves mentorship programmes for aspiring African designers and collaborations on the continent.

Market analysis tools
ITC developed several free-of-charge online market analysis tools, such as the Export Potential Map, Investment Map, Market Access Map, Procurement Map, Standard Map, and Trade Map.

EuroMed Trade and Investment Facilitation Mechanism
The EuroMed Trade and Investment Facilitation Mechanism comprises a free-of-charge online portal for country and product-specific information on tariffs and duties, import and export procedures, and market requirements. There are frequent information updates thanks to a network of national focal points in each participating Mediterranean country. The EuroMed Helpdesk is available in English, French, Arabic, and Turkish.

The goal is to boost economic integration as EuroMed countries often do not engage in intra-regional trade due partly to a lack of availability and transparency of trade-related information. The project is funded by the EU while the ITC is in charge of its implementation.

Ready4 Trade Central Asia
The Ready4Trade Central Asia programme works to promote international trade in Kazakhstan, Kyrgyzstan, Tajikistan, Turkmenistan, Uzbekistan, and it is funded by the EU.

EU-Sri Lanka Trade-Related Assistance
The EU-Sri Lanka Trade-Related Assistance project aims to increase the trade competitiveness of Sri Lankan Small and Medium Size Enterprises (SMEs) in regional and EU markets.

The project has a duration of four years and is worth 8 million euros, funded by the EU. It supports SME export competitiveness and value addition in various sectors, such as spices, food, and information technology.

The project addresses compliance standards and efficiencies in cross-border procedures, which are key constraints to market access, especially for SMEs.

Gambia Youth Empowerment Project YEP
The Gambia Youth Empowerment Project (YEP) aims to enhance the skills and employability of potential and returning migrants. 
The ITC supports youth employment and entrepreneurship through vocational training and partnerships with domestic and international skills development institutions and the private sector.

Netherlands Trust Fund – Phase III (NTF III)
The Netherlands Trust Fund III (NTF III) - Export Sector Competitiveness Programme launched in 2013 as a partnership between the Dutch Centre for the Promotion of Imports from developing countries (CBI), affiliated with the Ministry of Foreign Affairs of the Netherlands, and the ITC. The aim is to strengthen the competitiveness of IT services in Bangladesh, Kenya, and Uganda, the tourism sector in Myanmar, the avocado producers in Kenya, and coffee plantations in Uganda.

Non-Tariff Measures
The Non-Tariff Measures programme provides an interactive platform that fosters transparency and understanding of the obstacles that non-tariff measures pose to international trade by limiting exports and imports through specific compliances.

The programme is a multi-agency initiative that helps countries find solutions that take their needs into account and is collaborating closely with national and regional stakeholders.

Promoting Intra-regional Trade
The Promoting Intra-regional Trade programme launched in 2013 and focuses on increasing the export competitiveness of honey, mango, and spice-producing SMEs in Kenya, the United Republic of Tanzania, and Zambia. It is a three-year programme implemented by the ITC in collaboration with lead organizations in each country.

The Government of Finland finances the Promoting Intra-regional Trade Programme.

Women and Trade
The Women and Trade Programme is an initiative aiming at connecting 1 million women entrepreneurs to trade by 2020. This initiative contributes directly to the SDG number 5 by empowering women.

SheTrades 
The SheTrades initiative offers women entrepreneurs an online platform to connect to markets. The SheTrades app allows female entrepreneurs to share information about their companies, increasing their visibility and enabling them to internationalize, which helps to include more women entrepreneurs in the supply chains of corporations.

Greenbell Communications of Kenya teamed up with Google and CI&T to develop a suggestion. The SheTrades platform was launched in 2015 at the International Women in Business Forum in Nairobi. Organizations signed on to the platform to verify women entrepreneurs are members of their networks.

Youth and Trade Programme
The Youth and Trade Programme focuses on providing a strong environment in which young entrepreneurs can evolve and receive assistance when needed. This helps them grow and internationalize while providing income opportunities, which helps the economy grow.

The programme contributes directly to the Sustainable Development Goal 4 (Skills for entrepreneurship) and goal 8 (decent work and inclusive growth).

Tools

Export Potential Map 
The Export Potential Map is an online tool that allows businesses and countries to identify which goods and services to export and their destination. Through the precise economic analysis provided by the Export Potential Map, companies can target new markets and policymakers can optimize their policies and support programmes for their exporters.

The Export Potential Map covers information about 222 countries and territories.

Investment Map 
The Investment Map is designed to help investment promotion agencies (IPAs) in defining priority sectors for investment promotion, identifying potential investors in a given sector, identifying competitor countries for inward investment, and defining opportunities for bilateral investment. It holds a vast amount of information and statistics on foreign direct investment and international trade, tariff data and activities of multinational firms, and it allows analysis by country, trading partner, and sector.

The Investment Map was developed by the United Nations Conference on Trade and Development (UNCTAD) and ITC in partnership with the World Association of Investment Promotion Agencies (WAIPA) and the Multilateral Investment Guarantee Agency (MIGA), which is part of the World Bank Group.

Market Access Map

The Market Access Map is a tool that provides information on applied customs tariffs, including MFN tariffs and preferences granted unilaterally and reciprocally in the framework of regional and bilateral trade agreements. Users can find ad valorem equivalents (AVEs) for non-ad valorem duties in order to compare tariffs across countries and simulate tariff reduction scenarios. The application also covers tariff rate quotas, trade remedies, rules of origin, corresponding documentation, bound tariffs of WTO members, non-tariff measures (NTMs), and trade flows to help users prioritize and analyse export markets and prepare for market access negotiations.

Rules of Origin Facilitator 
The Rules of Origin Facilitator provides free and user-friendly access to ITC’s database of rules of origin and origin-related documentation in hundreds of trade agreements. The Facilitator is also combined with the huge tariff and trade agreements databases underlying the Market Access Map, resulting in a market-intelligence solution enabling companies, particularly ones from developing countries, to benefit from trade agreements worldwide. Currently, the Facilitator contains data from more than 250 FTAs applied by more than 190 countries. This database is expanding gradually with the ultimate goal to cover over 400 FTAs and preferential schemes that are currently active in the world.

The Facilitator aims to help small and medium-sized enterprises to increase trade by taking advantage of global trade opportunities in the form of low-duty rates under trade agreements. The tool can also be used by policymakers, trade negotiators, economists, and various other users. Any user can look for information on origin criteria, other origin provisions, and trade documentation by entering the HS code of their product.

Procurement Map 
The Procurement Map was designed by the ITC to boost entrepreneurship and market opportunities by offering users detailed information on over 150,000 public tenders. The map allows users to undertake a search by country or economic sector, which allows them to identify potential buyers.

Standard Map 
The Standard Map provides verified and transparent information on more than 200 voluntary sustainability standards and other similar initiatives covering issues ranging from food quality to safety. This allows producers, manufacturers, brands, retailers, researchers, and policymakers to identify standards relevant for their own businesses, compare them and save, and share their sustainability diagnostic report with actors along the value chain via the Sustainability Network. In addition to the map, ITC published a literature review series with technical papers on the impacts of private standards to international trade.

Trade Map 
The Trade Map developed by the ITC offers strategic market research with detailed statistical information on international trade flows, which can help users gauge the competitiveness of national and sectoral trade performance and identify priority products and markets for trade development for both firms and trade support institutions.

Events

SheTrades Global 
SheTrades Global is a two-day annual conference. The first forum took place in 2011, and until 2018, the conference was called Women Vendors Exhibition and Forum.

Trade for Sustainable Development Forum (T4SD)
The Trade for Sustainable Development Forum (T4SD) is an annual event organized by the ITC.

T4SD connects communities in policy and business, and trade and sustainability, while challenging thought leaders to bridge the gap between debates on sustainability standards, supply chains, and international trade, which is beneficial in the journey towards achieving the UN Global Goals for Sustainable Development (SDGs).

Trade Promotion Organization (TPO) World Conference and Network
Created in 1996 with the intention to offer a platform to facilitate the dynamic exchange of information, good practices, experiences, and export-oriented services collaborations among Trade Promotion Organizations (TPOs), the Trade Promotion Organization Network provides a platform where individual organizations may benefit from the synergies of TPOs working together in order to achieve continual and mutual improvement through online and offline forums.

The TPO Network World Conference takes place every two years and is open to all trade support institutions mandated to provide trade-related technical support services.

During the conference, TPO Network Awards are awarded to leading national trade promotion organisations mandated by their governments to promote the export promotion strategies of their countries. TPOs participate in the TPO Network Awards in categories defined according to the economic development status of the countries in which their national headquarters are located.

The World Export Development Forum (WEDF)
The World Export Development Forum (WEDF) is an annual global platform with the goal to develop SMEs. The first conference was held in 1999, and the event is attended by more than 600 senior national and international policymakers, heads of trade support organizations, business leaders, and representatives of international agencies.

WEDF comprises high-level plenaries, workshops, and facilitates business-to-business meetings, enabling participants to increase their practical knowledge in the latest innovations, processes, and policies, while expanding their networks.

Partner Events
ITC, with its goal to support SMEs and their development impact in international trade, collaborates with its partner organizations, the World Trade Organization (WTO) and the United Nations Conference on Trade and Development (UNCTAD), for events in order to achieve its aim. Examples for this partnership include, amongst others, the WTO Public Forum and Aid for Trade conference.

Executive Directors
ITC had, since its creation in 1964, six executive directors. Twice in its history, the position was vacant, both in the early seventies and the early nineties.

ITC's executive director is a senior international civil servant of the United Nations with the level of Assistant Secretary-General. ITC's executive director and the Deputy-Executive Director are appointed by the heads of its two parent organizations, the Director-General of the WTO and the Secretary-General of the UNCTAD.

Funding
The work of the ITC is financed by contributions from the private sector and resources provided by beneficiary countries and international organizations.

See also

 United Nations
 World Trade Organization
 United Nations Conference on Trade and Development
 Trade and development

References

United Nations Development Group
United Nations General Assembly subsidiary organs
International development organizations
International trade organizations
World Trade Organization
Organizations established in 1964
United Nations organizations based in Geneva